Echinolittorina jamaicensis is a species of sea snail, a marine gastropod mollusk in the family Littorinidae, the winkles or periwinkles.

Distribution
This species is distributed throughout the Caribbean region.

Description 
The maximum recorded shell length is 19.1 mm.

Habitat 
Minimum recorded depth is 0 m.

References

Littorinidae
Gastropods described in 1850